Troy Johnson (born August 13, 1973) is a writer, food critic, and television personality from San Diego. He has been on several Food Network shows as a panelist and a judge on Iron Chef America and The Best Thing I Ever Ate. He is best known as a judge on the Food Network show Guy's Grocery Games since its inception in 2013 and Campus Eats on the Big Ten Network since 2016. He previously hosted Crave which was also on the Food Network, an award winning music show in San Diego called Fox Rox, and a San Diego Padres pregame show entitled Outta Left Field.

Early life and education
Johnson was raised in Rancho Peñasquitos, a suburb of San Diego, and attended Mt. Carmel High School. He graduated in 1997 from California State University, Chico with a bachelor's degree in speech communications and poetry.

Career
After college, he began writing as a music journalist where from 2002 to 2007 he was the music editor of the San Diego CityBeat.  During that time he wrote pieces for Billboard and Spin. He has also written articles for magazines such as Surfer, Rolling Stone, Mojo and Paper. He also wrote and hosted a San Diego TV show about indie rock called Fox Rox, which ran from 2001 to 2007.  The show garnered a number of local Emmy Awards.  From 2006-2007, he hosted a San Diego Padres pregame show entitled Outta Left Field. In 2007, he parlayed his music journalism into food writing. In 2007 as the senior editor of Modern Luxury’s Riviera magazine, working under James Beard Award winner Brad Johnson. Johnson soon developed a reputation as a food critic.

In 2008 when both shows were cancelled, lifestyle publication Riviera Magazine gave Johnson the opportunity to write about food.  The next three years were spent editing the award winning food critic. That time was also spent cultivating his palate, studying flash cards, and talking to chefs.  When that critic left, the opportunity to presented itself to become the next food critic.  His first editorial of a local Italian restaurant impressed the editorial staff.  It also won Best in Show for the San Diego Press Club.

In 2010, Johnson responded to a Food Network blog searching for hosts and submitted a six minute long audition tape.  In 2011, he wrote and hosted the culinary travel series, filming nine episodes in six weeks. Crave aired in August 2011 on the Food Network. After two seasons and declining ratings, the show was cancelled.  Later in 2011, he became the food and restaurant editor-at-large and dining critic for San Diego Magazine. He has appeared on other Food Network shows including Iron Chef America and The Best Thing I Ever Ate.

After becoming a fan favorite on Crave and it being the number two show in reruns on Fridays, the Food Network asked Johnson to become a judge on Guy's Grocery Games which started in 2013.  He is still a rotating judge.  He has published a book about growing up with a lesbian mother, titled Family Outing.

In 2016, Johnson started hosting another food related show for the Big Ten Network entitled Campus Eats which he has co-hosted with Jenny Dell.  The two go to different university campuses and try the local fare.

Personal life
Johnson is a lifelong fan of the San Diego Padres.

Filmography

References

External links
HeyTroyJohnson - Official website
Get to Know Guy's Grocery Games Judge Troy Johnson

1973 births
Living people
American male writers
People from San Diego
California State University, Chico alumni
American television hosts
Writers from San Diego